The 2003–04 ULEB Cup was the second season of the second-tier level European professional club basketball competition, EuroCup Basketball, organized by the Euroleague Basketball Company.  The EuroCup is the European-wide league level that is one tier below the EuroLeague level.  Thirty-six teams participated in the competition.  The final was held on April 13, in Charleroi, Belgium, between Real Madrid and Hapoel Jerusalem, the latter winning it by a score of 82–73.

Teams of the 2003–2004 ULEB Cup

Format
The 2003–04 ULEB Cup featured a total of 36 teams, divided into six groups of six.  The round-robin group stage was followed by knock-out stages.  The regular season began in November 2003.

Regular season

All 36 teams in 6 groups played a round-robin competition, home and away.  Two teams from each group advanced to the knockout stage (eighth-finals).  Four teams with best third place records in their respective groups also advanced to the knockout stage.

Eighth-finals

The winners from the eighthfinals advanced to the quarterfinals.  The matches were played as two games, home and away.  The match winners were determined by point differential.

Quarterfinals

The winners from the quarterfinals advanced to the semifinals.  The matches were played as two games, home and away.  The match winners were determined by point differential.

Semifinals

The winners from the semifinals advanced to the finals.  The matches were played as two games, home and away.  The match winners were determined by point differential.

Final

The match was played as one game.

Regular season

Elimination rounds

Bracket

Source: ULEB Cup

Top 16 

|}

Quarterfinals

|}

Semifinals

|}

Final

April 13, Spiroudome, Charleroi

|}

Finals MVP
 Kelly McCarty (Hapoel Jerusalem)

External links
ULEB Cup 2003-04 on Eurocupbasketball.com
Eurobasket.com

 
2003–04 in European basketball
EuroCup Basketball seasons